The Primetime Emmy Award for Outstanding Cinematography for a Multi-Camera Series was an annual award presented as part of the Primetime Emmy Awards. It was created in 2000, alongside the Primetime Emmy Award for Outstanding Cinematography for a Single-Camera Series. In 2023, it will be combined with Single-Camera Series to form Outstanding Cinematography for a Series (Half-Hour).

Winners and nominations

2000s

2010s

2020s

Programs with multiple awards

5 wins
 Will & Grace

3 wins
 How I Met Your Mother
 The Ranch
 Two and a Half Men

Cinematographers with multiple awards

4 wins
 Tony Askins

3 wins
 Gary Baum
 Chris La Fountaine
 Donald A. Morgan
 Steven V. Silver

Programs with multiple nominations
Totals include nominations for Outstanding Cinematography for a Single-Camera Series (Half-Hour).

9 nominations
 Will & Grace

8 nominations
 Two and a Half Men

5 nominations
 How I Met Your Mother
 2 Broke Girls

4 nominations
 According to Jim
 Everybody Loves Raymond
 Mike & Molly
 The Ranch

3 nominations
 Frasier
 Friends

2 nominations
 The Big Bang Theory
 The Exes
 Last Man Standing
 Pair of Kings
 Reba
 Rules of Engagement
 Spin City
 Superior Donuts

Cinematographers with multiple nominations

12 nominations
 Gary Baum

11 nominations
 Donald A. Morgan
 Steven V. Silver

9 nominations
 Chris La Fountaine
 George Mooradian 

6 nominations
 Tony Askins

4 nominations
 Mike Berlin
 John Simmons

3 nominations
 Ken Lamkin
 Patti Lee
 Nick McLean

2 nominations
 Bryan Hays
 Wayne Kennan
 Richard Quinlan
 Peter Smokler

References

Cinematography for a Multi-Camera Series
Awards for best cinematography